HD 221287 b, also known as Pipitea, is an exoplanet that orbits HD 221287, approximately 173 light years away in the constellation of Tucana. This planet has mass >3.12 MJ (>992 M🜨) and orbits in a habitable zone at 1.25 AUs (6.06 μpc) from the star, taking 1.25 years to orbit at 29.9 km/s around the star. Naef discovered this planet in early 2007 by using HARPS spectrograph located in Chile.

Based on a probable 10−4 fraction of the planet mass as a satellite, the planet can have a Mars-sized moon with habitable surface. On the other hand, this mass can be distributed into many small satellites as well.

It was named "Pipitea" by representatives of the Cook Islands in the IAU's 2019 NameExoWorlds contest, with the comment "Pipitea is a small, white and gold pearl found in Penrhyn lagoon in the northern group of the Cook Islands."

Insolation data for HD 221287 b 

From Luminosity and distance irridance can be calculated:

See also 
 HD 100777 b
 HD 190647 b

Notes

References

External links 

Giant planets
Tucana (constellation)
Exoplanets discovered in 2007
Exoplanets detected by radial velocity
Giant planets in the habitable zone
Exoplanets with proper names

es:HD 221287#Sistema planetario